Alex Beniaidze (born February 8, 1991) is an alpine skier from Georgia. He competed for Georgia at the 2014 Winter Olympics in the giant slalom and the slalom.

Beniaidze currently resides in Bruneck, Italy.

See also
Georgia at the 2014 Winter Olympics

References

1991 births
Living people
Alpine skiers at the 2014 Winter Olympics
Male alpine skiers from Georgia (country)
Olympic alpine skiers of Georgia (country)
People from Mtskheta-Mtianeti